SS Russia was a Cunard liner built by J & G Thomson of Glasgow.  She was launched 20 March 1867 and made her maiden voyage in June of the same year.  The writer Charles Dickens returned to England on the Russia after his second tour of the United States and was fulsome in his praise of the ship. On 25 May 1869, Russia ran into the ship Figlia Maggiore of Trieste off Bedloes Island, New York City, which sank without loss of life.

She was sold to the Red Star Line in 1880 and renamed Waesland. Red Star replaced her engine with a compound engine which, in 1889, was replaced in turn with a triple expansion engine.  In 1895 she was chartered to the American Line for use on their services to Philadelphia.  In 1902 she was in collision with the Harmonides, formerly the Woolloomooloo of Lund's Blue Anchor Line, off the coast of Anglesey and sank with the loss of two lives.

For many years a painting of the Russia hung in the London offices of Cunard.

References

Victorian-era passenger ships of the United Kingdom
Passenger ships of the United States
Ships of the Cunard Line
Ships built on the River Clyde
1867 ships
Maritime incidents in 1902
Shipwrecks in the Irish Sea
Ships sunk in collisions